One was a Macedonian GSM/UMTS mobile operator. The company was under a 100-per-cent ownership of Telekom Slovenije.
The network of One was covering 99,9% of the population and 98,17% of the territory of Macedonia with quality signal.

One has launched the first DVB-T in Macedonia, BoomTV.

One used to host it's network at an mvno operator called Albafone. It started operations in 2013 and ceased operations in 2015.

In 2015, One merged with Vip operator into one mobile network operator - one.Vip, under the name Vip, with Telekom Austria (Vip) having an equity interest of 55% and Telekom Slovenije (One) having an equity interest of 45%. The agreement includes options for the exit of the Telekom Slovenije Group within three years of the transaction's closing date.

In November 2017 sold to Telekom Austria.

External links
One Operator

Mobile phone companies of North Macedonia